Virginia Anne Chadwick AO (19 December 194417 September 2009) was a Liberal Member of the New South Wales Legislative Council from 1978 to 1999. She was the first NSW female Minister for Education; the first female President of the New South Wales Legislative Council; and Chair and CEO of the Great Barrier Reef Marine Park Authority.

Early life 

She was born in Newcastle and educated at the Newcastle Girls High School from 1967 until 1968, then at Dormers Wells, Southall, UK 1969–70. She attended Newcastle Technical College 1971–73 and achieved her B.A., Dip.Ed. at the University of Newcastle.

Political career 
Chadwick served as a Member of the Liberal Party State Executive before being elected to the NSW Legislative Council in 1978. She served as Opposition Whip and a member of the Opposition front bench before becoming the first female NSW Liberal Minister when the Greiner Government swept into power in 1988.

Chadwick was a minister of the Greiner-Fahey era, initially serving as Minister for Family and Community Services, Minister for the Hunter and Minister for Women (25 March 198820 July 1990). Following the resignation of Education Minister Terry Metherell, Chadwick was appointed the state's first female Minister for Education (20 July 19904 April 1995), and was later given additional responsibility as Minister for Tourism (26 May 19934 April 1995).

Chadwick's appointment to the Education portfolio followed Minister Terry Metherell who reduced head office staffing, introduced Basic Skills testing and increased class sizes to pay for Special Education initiatives. Metherell's style quickly escalated to war with the Teachers Union, the Parents and Citizens Federation and even his own department. The strikes and protest rallies held during this unrest were amongst the largest in NSW history. As the new Minister, Chadwick's first task was to broker peace between the Government and the Education lobby, especially teachers. The first breakthrough came with a settlement to the long-running teachers pay dispute.

During her time in Education, Chadwick drew on her consultative skills to implement extensive reforms initiated by her predecessor. (These reforms are known as "School Centred Education" (Scott Reports) and in Curriculum, the 'Carrick' and 'Excellence and Equity' Reports.) The NSW Board of Studies was established, key learning areas developed and implemented in curriculum and schools; budgeting and some staffing responsibilities were devolved to school principals; more than a thousand local school councils were established. Selective schools, "centres of excellence" and specialist schools such as Westfields Sports High School were funded to create choice in public education in Sydney's West as well as regional and rural areas of the state.

A Greiner loyalist, Chadwick was concerned during the 1992 Independent Commission Against Corruption investigation of the Metherell Affair, when Greiner was forced to resign. Although a Member of the Upper House, Chadwick was viewed by many as an obvious successor to Greiner; but when approached to take the leadership, she declined.

If Chadwick had become Premier whilst still a member of the Legislative Council it would not have been without precedence as Barrie Unsworth was a member of the Upper House when he became Premier in 1986 before resigning from the Upper House to successfully transfer to the Lower House.

Following the 1990 murder convictions and 18-year prison sentences handed down to 8 students from Sydney's Cleveland Street High School and a North Shore Catholic School for the gay related killing of Richard Johnson, Virginia Chadwick became the first education minister to directly address the issue of homophobic bullying and violence in New South Wales schools. Gay teacher Wayne Tonks was also brutally murdered by two 16-year-old students from Cleveland Street High School, after he had received threats at school and had had his house ransacked.

As a result, the Gay and Lesbian Teachers and Students Association (GaLTaS), was formed in 1990 by gay high school teacher Derek Williams, and lesbian student Jennifer Glass to tackle ongoing issues of homophobic school bullying, suicidal ideation, gay youth and homicide by students, via workshops, teacher training and books in schools programmes.

After learning of reports of homophobic bullying and violence at NSW schools, Chadwick met Williams and some of the affected GaLTaS students at the New South Wales Parliament.  By November 1993, she had implemented the School Anti-discrimination Grievance Procedures for Students, to enable gay students in New South Wales to achieve legal redress under the NSW Anti-Discrimination Act and to complete their education. In consultation with NSW Parents and Citizens, the New South Wales Teachers Federation, the Board of Studies, the NSW Antidiscrimination Board and GaLTaS, Chadwick approved departmental anti-homophobia videos and issued a vetted reading list for school libraries.

After GaLTaS was awarded a Federal National Youth Grant of $30,000 by the Federal Government of Australia to establish a toll-free hotline for victimised gay and lesbian students, the research obtained was compiled by GaLTaS co-convener Ms Jacqui Griffin into The SchoolWatch Report. The report was officially launched by Chadwick in March 1995 at Randwick Boys High School where Derek Williams taught.  Following her launch of The SchoolWatch Report, Chadwick continued her reforms of departmental policy on gay related education issues until the defeat of the Liberal government at the 1995 New South Wales state election.

In 1998 Chadwick again made history as the Parliament of New South Wales's first woman Presiding Officer with her election as President of the Legislative Council. Her victory in the ballot for the Presidency was a surprise. The Labor Government's nominee for the position was Hon Helen Sham-Ho who had suddenly defected from the Liberal Party days before the ballot. The Government Leader in the Legislative Council, Michael Egan (Australian politician) mistakenly believed that one of the Government members who was absent from the House on leave for an exam would be paired. (Pairs are a courtesy arrangement in Parliament whereby an Opposition Member would have abstained from the vote when a Government member is absent, or vice versa). The Clerk of the Parliaments advised midway through the ballot that pairs did not apply for secret ballots. The Government tried to call off the vote but was advised that this was not possible after ballot papers for the secret ballot had been issued. Chadwick defeated Sham Ho by 21–19. She held this position from 29 June 1998 to 5 March 1999, when she retired from politics. Chadwick holds the record for the shortest presidency of the Legislative Council, being in office for 250 days.

Great Barrier Reef Marine Park Authority 

Soon after her retirement from State politics, Federal Environment Minister Robert Hill appointed Chadwick as Chairperson and CEO of the Great Barrier Reef Marine Park Authority (GBRMPA). She moved to Townsville with husband Bruce Chadwick and served in this role until her retirement in July 2007. Chadwick led the difficult negotiations with fishermen, farmers, tourist operators, local, state and federal Governments to achieve an increase in highly protected areas on the reef from 4.5 per cent to 33 per cent. This was recognised in 2004 when the Authority was presented a prestigious Banksia Award by the Banksia Environmental Foundation. In the same year she was awarded the international Fred M. Packard Award in 2004, jointly with Imogen Zethoven of WWF Australia, for their work "furthering the conservation objectives of protected areas" to the Australian community.

Following a potential crisis involving an oil tanker attempting to navigate through the Reef, Chadwick was appointed to a safety inquiry and so impressed the stakeholders she was then appointed to the Australian Maritime Safety Authority (AMSA) Advisory Committee. She subsequently led an Australian delegation to the United Nations on International Law of the Sea.

Personal life 
In the 2005 Queen's Birthday Honours Chadwick was appointed an Officer of the Order of Australia. The citation was "For service to conservation and the environment through management of the environmental, heritage and economic sustainability issues affecting the Great Barrier Reef, and to the New South Wales Parliament, particularly in the areas of child welfare and education."

Chadwick and her husband Bruce retired and returned to their Novocastrian roots, living at Lake Macquarie. The couple had two children, Amanda and David, and three surviving grandchildren.

She died from cancer on 17 September 2009, aged 64, at Toronto.

Virginia Chadwick Memorial Foundation

Following her death, the Virginia Chadwick Memorial Foundation  was established and operated from 2010 to 2020 to carry on Virginia Chadwick's work and build on her achievements especially in regard to the Great Barrier Reef and through environmental activities, including environmental education, environmental partnerships, Indigenous engagement, networking and knowledge sharing around the world 

The Foundation was Chaired by Fay Barker who succeeded Mrs Chadwick as CEO of GBRMA and membership included Hon Catherine Cusack MLC. Ms Barker described Mrs Chadwick’s achievements in a message to the NSW Parliament on 11 May 2022 when a marble bust of Mrs Chadwick was unveiled in the Legislative Council Chamber. The unveiling of the marble bust of Mrs Chadwick was the first time in 107 years a new bust had been added to the historic NSW Legislative Council Chamber. A motion acknowledging the significance of the event and Mrs Chadwick’s achievements was moved by Catherine Cusack MLC and replied to by Penny Sharpe MLC.

References

 Advisory Board Member, Australian National Centre for Ocean Resources and Security
 

 

1944 births
2009 deaths
Australian schoolteachers
Deaths from cancer in New South Wales
Liberal Party of Australia members of the Parliament of New South Wales
Members of the New South Wales Legislative Council
People from Newcastle, New South Wales
Presidents of the New South Wales Legislative Council
20th-century Australian politicians
20th-century Australian women politicians
Women members of the New South Wales Legislative Council
Officers of the Order of Australia